George Frederick Bernard Powell (15 August 1928 – 20 April 2013), credited as Nosher Powell, Freddie Powell, or Fred Powell, was an English actor, stuntman and boxer. He is best known for his work in the James Bond film series, most notably From Russia with Love (1963).

Life and career
Powell was born in Camberwell, London, England. His younger brother, Dinny Powell (Dennis Powell, born 1932 in Camberwell) followed a similar career, acting and stunt co-ordinating many films, as have his sons Greg Powell and Gary Powell. Powell was given the nickname of "Nosher" while he served in the army. "Nosh" means food in Cockney slang and was given to Powell due to his large physique. He disliked his birth name Frederick or Freddie and chose to use Nosher Powell as his screen name.

Powell began his career as a heavyweight boxing champion in the worlds of unlicensed fighting and the professional arena. He also worked as a sparring partner for Joe Louis, Sugar Ray Robinson and Muhammad Ali, amongst others. The last fight of his career was against Menzies Johnson in 1960. Powell won the fight on points, over eight rounds. According to his autobiography, Powell had a total of seventy-eight fights: fifty-one as a professional, with nine losses, though he was never knocked out. Boxrec.com, though, lists Powell as losing sixteen times as a professional, with nine of those losses being by KO, two by TKO and five on points. Powell's boxing career was ended following injuries he sustained after being hit by a lorry in Covent Garden Market, where he was working as a porter. He later became a boxing instructor in Brixton.

Powell had an extensive but mostly uncredited career in stunt work and acting, including as stuntman in 14 James Bond films. Amongst his TV work, was the role of the powerful thug Lord Dorking in Randall and Hopkirk (Deceased), in which was first broadcast on 26 October 1969.

In 1966, Powell played a role of a jewel thief Charlie in the series The Baron. On 26 April 1972 he was guest of honour in an episode in the UK version of This Is Your Life.

Powell later became the head of a collective of people dressing as medieval knights. Powell began the projects because of the lack of stunt work resulting from a industry wide recession. In August 1971, Powell took part in a re-enactment of the battle at Senlac Hill in nylon armour. The event drew a crowd of ten thousand spectators. Powell and his group of knights concentrated on medieval practises such as Jousting. Powell and fellow stunt man Max Diamond also founded the British Jousting Society. In 1972, they began a British tour of the tournaments which were staged at Lichfield, Norwich, Edinburgh and the Tower of London. In the performances, Powell went by the character name of "Frederick of Gaywood". In 1975, Powell took his "Tournament of Knights" tour to the United States. He promoted his group's tour by walking through San Francisco in a jousting costume.

In 1987, Powell played a character who shared his name in the film, Eat the Rich. Powell was cast in the role by director Peter Richardson. Powell had known Richardson for some years and he wanted a stunt man who was willing to hang out of a helicopter and knew Powell would be willing. Powell later recalled that he worried the role would be recast if he could not give a good acting performance beyond his stunt work.

He also acted as a "minder" (bodyguard) for a number of celebrities, including John Paul Getty Jr. and Sammy Davis, Jr.

Personal life and death
In 1951 Powell married Pauline Wellman, and the couple had two sons, Greg and Gary, who also grew up to become stuntmen.

Powell died in his sleep on 20 April 2013 at the age of 84.

Filmography

Acting credits:
Oliver Twist (1948) - Undetermined Minor Role (uncredited)
There Is Another Sun (1951) - Teddy Green
Emergency Call (1952) - Boy Booth 
Cosh Boy (1953) - Instructor (uncredited)
Demetrius and the Gladiators (1954) - Gladiator (uncredited)
The Dark Avenger (1955) - (uncredited)
King's Rhapsody (1955) - (uncredited)
Violent Playground (1958)
The Road to Hong Kong (1962) - Man (uncredited)
Call Me Bwana (1963) - Man (uncredited)
A Shot in the Dark (1964) - Man (uncredited)
A Fistful of Dollars (1964) - Cowboy con cartel 'adios amigo' (uncredited)
She (1965) - British Soldier (uncredited)
'The Baron (1966) - Charlie
Circus of Fear (1966) - Red
The Sandwich Man (1966) - Nosher - Bus Driver (uncredited)
Casino Royale (1967) - British Officer (uncredited)
Oliver! (1968) - Man (uncredited)
Crooks and Coronets (1969) - Casino Security (uncredited)
School for Sex (1969) - Hector
Crossplot (1969)
The Magic Christian (1969) - Ike Jones (uncredited)
One More Time (1970) - Man (uncredited)
You Can't Win 'Em All (1970) - Horse Rider (uncredited)
Venom (aka The Legend of Spider Forest) (1971) - Gang member
On the Buses (1971) - Betty's Husband
The Alf Garnett Saga (1972) - Ginger (uncredited)
Nearest and Dearest (1972) - Bouncer
The Mackintosh Man (1973) - Armed Guard
Love Thy Neighbour (1973) - Bus Driver
Carry on Dick (1974) - Footpad (uncredited)
Brannigan (1975) - Man in Bar (uncredited)
Never Too Young to Rock (1976)
The Stick Up (1977) - Manager
If You Go Down in the Woods Today (1981) - Govnor's Henchman
Victor Victoria (1982) - Man in Bar (uncredited)
Krull (1983) - Slayer in the Swamp (uncredited)
Eat the Rich (1987) - Nosher Powell
Willow (1988) - Nelwyn Villager (uncredited)
Legionnaire (1998) - Soldier
Shiner (2000) - Special Character (final film role)

References

External links

ISBN Nosher! listing

1928 births
2013 deaths
20th-century English male actors
Boxers from Greater London
English male boxers
English male film actors
English male television actors
English stunt performers
Heavyweight boxers
Male actors from London
People from Camberwell